Mexico competed at the 1928 Summer Olympics in Amsterdam, Netherlands. 30 competitors, all men, took part in 18 events in 6 sports.

Athletics

Track & road events

Field events

Boxing

Diving

Ranks given are within the heat.

Fencing

Football

Summary

Men's tournament
Team roster

Round of 16

Consolation tournament, First Round

Art competitions

Art competitions were part of the Olympic program from 1912 to 1948, but were discontinued due to concerns about amateurism and professionalism.

References

External links
Official Olympic Reports

Nations at the 1928 Summer Olympics
1928
1928 in Mexican sports